Kenneth M. Jacobs (born 1957/1958) is the chairman and chief executive officer of Lazard since November 16, 2009. Jacobs joined Lazard in 1988. Jacobs was named a Lazard Partner in 1991, and in 2002 he was named Deputy Chairman and Head of North America for Lazard. In this role, he focused on enhancing the firm's business by entering into new markets and adding new practices, such as restructuring, strategic capital structure advice, and private fund advisory. He also focused on bringing in new staff specializing in energy, technology and healthcare.

Jacobs has also expanded Lazard’s financial advisory business through an acquisition in the US Middle Market, which is now called Lazard Middle Market.
 
Jacobs is a member of the Board of Trustees of the University of Chicago and the Brookings Institution. Jacobs earned a B.A. in economics from the University of Chicago and an M.B.A. from the Stanford University Graduate School of Business. He is a member of the Steering Committee of the Bilderberg Group.

Personal life
Jacobs is married to Agnès Mentre, daughter of French banker and politician, Paul Mentré; she was a former Lazard banker who later became a film producer including such credits as The Wrestler, the Michael Moore documentary Fahrenheit 9/11, and Wind River.

References

External links 
 Lazard Leadership Profile

American chief executives of financial services companies
Living people
Members of the Steering Committee of the Bilderberg Group
Place of birth missing (living people)
Year of birth missing (living people)
Stanford Graduate School of Business alumni
University of Chicago alumni
American Jews
1950s births